Thoracopteridae is an extinct family of prehistoric bony fish; classified with the order Peltopleuriformes. This lineage of Triassic flying fish-like Perleidiformes converted their pectoral and pelvic fins into broad wings very similar to those of their modern counterparts. However, this group is not related to modern flying fish from the family Exocoetidae, instead being a case of convergent evolution.

Classification
 Family †Thoracopteridae Griffith 1977 sensu Xu et al. 2012
 Genus †Gigantopterus Abel 1906
 †Gigantopterus telleri Abel 1906
 Genus †Italopterus Shen & Arratia 2022
 †Italopterus martinisi (Tintori & Sassi 1992)
 †Italopterus magnificus Tintori & Sassi 1987
 Genus †Potanichthys Xu et al. 2012
 †Potanichthys wushaensis Xu et al. 2012
 Genus †Pterygopterus Kner 1867 non Butler 1876
 †Pterygopterus apus Kner 1867 non Butler 1876
 Genus †Urocomus Costa 1862
 †Urocomus picenus Costa 1862
 Genus †Wushaichthys Xu et al. 2015
 †Wushaichthys exquisitus Xu et al. 2015
 Genus †Thoracopterus Bronn 1858
 †Thoracopterus niederristi Bronn 1858

Bibliography

References

Peltopleuriformes
Gliding animals
Prehistoric ray-finned fish families